The 1992 Nigerian Senate election in Bauchi State was held on July 4, 1992, to elect members of the Nigerian Senate to represent Bauchi State. Ibrahim Lame representing Bauchi Central, Mohammed Uba Ahmed representing Bauchi East and Mohammed Bello Katagum representing Bauchi North all won on the platform of the National Republican Convention.

Overview

Summary

Results

Bauchi Central 
The election was won by Ibrahim Lame of the National Republican Convention.

Bauchi East 
The election was won by Mohammed Uba Ahmed of the National Republican Convention.

Bauchi North 
The election was won by Mohammed Bello Katagum of the National Republican Convention.

References 

Bau
Bauchi State Senate elections
July 1992 events in Nigeria